Salomé Báncora (born February 28, 1993 in Buenos Aires, Argentina) is an alpine skier competing for Argentina. She competed for Argentina at the 2014 Winter Olympics in the slalom and giant slalom.

2014:
 Campeona Argentina de Slalom

2015:
 Campeona Argentina de Slalom Gigante

2016:
 Campeona Argentina de Slalom

References

External links 
 
 
 
 

1993 births
Living people
Argentine female alpine skiers
Olympic alpine skiers of Argentina
Alpine skiers at the 2014 Winter Olympics
Skiers from Buenos Aires